Romulo & Julita (Spanish: Rómulo y Julita) is a 2020 Peruvian romantic comedy film directed by Daniel Martín Rodríguez. The film starring Mónica Sánchez and Miguel Iza. It's inspired by the story of Romeo and Juliet by William Shakespeare, and is Rodríguez's second film

Plot 
The classic impossible love story of Romeo and Juliet, in the middle of a war between two motorcycle taxi companies in the picturesque town of Berona.

Cast 
The cast is composed of:

 Mónica Sánchez as Julita Capullito
 Miguel Iza as Rómulo Monitor
 Mayella Lloclla as Mercuria Monitor
 Pietro Sibille as Teo Capullito
 Ana Cecilia Natteri as Katiuska
 Franco Cabrera as Carioca Monitor
 César Ritter as Father Lautaro
 Anahí de Cárdenas as María del Carmen
 Jesús Neyra as José Ignacio
 Jessica Newton
 Emilram Cossío as Benito Monitor
 Dante of the Eagle as Royer
 Gabriel Iglesias
 Herbert Corimanya as "Cat Chest" Capuillto
 Andrea Luna as Magdalena
 Tommy Parraga as Alex
 Jorge Bardales as Caremalo Monitor
 Zoe Arevalo as Juliet
 Cindy Diaz as Clarita
 Julia Thays as Susanna
 Bruno Pinasco

Production 
The film is shot in two weeks in Lima y Canta, and is Sánchez's first leading film role. It is written by Gonzalo Rodríguez Risco and Pablo Carrillo.

It was released on February 27, 2020.

References

External links 

 

2020 films
2020 romantic comedy films
Peruvian romantic comedy films
2020s Peruvian films
2020s Spanish-language films

Films set in Peru
Films shot in Peru
Films based on Romeo and Juliet